Arman Mia (born 10 October 1977) is a retired Bangladeshi professional footballer who played as an attacking midfielder. He played for the Bangladesh national team from 1993 to 2006.

International career

Bangladesh national team
Arman was part of the 2003 SAFF Cup winning Bangladesh team and was named as the best midfielder of the tournament.

Honours

Club
Muktijoddha Sangsad KC
 National Football Championship: 2003
 Bangladesh Federation Cup: 2001, 2003
 Dhaka Premier League: 1997–98, 
 McDowell Cup: 1998

International
Bangladesh
 SAFF Championship: 2003

References

Living people
1977 births
Bangladeshi footballers
Bangladesh international footballers
Association football midfielders
Bangladesh youth international footballers
Abahani Limited (Dhaka) players
Brothers Union players
Mohammedan SC (Dhaka) players
Muktijoddha Sangsad KC players